Juan Carlos Villalta Atlagic (born December 29, 1944) is a Chilean journalist and sports commentator who was awarded with the Sports Journalism National Prize in 2017.

Biography
On 25 January 2019, he was released from Canal del Fútbol (CDF), where he worked since its beginnings in 2000s.

In 2015, he criticized to Chile Films in virtue of its workers' situation (despite his good relation with its CEO Cristian Varela).

In 2017, he was criticized by Chilean goalkeeper Nicolás Peric, who was supported by SIFUP (Chilean footballers union).

Political career
In 2019, during 2019–20 protests, he expressed his «fear» of «a new confrontation between Chileans as during Popular Unity» against Chilean Armed Forces which had as result the 1973 coup d'État and Augusto Pinochet dictatorship.

In 2020, it was reported that he will run a pre-candidacy for Papudo mayor. Finally, after losing mayor primaries, it was confirmed that he will run as alderman.

References

External links
 Juan Carlos Villalta on INAF

1944 births
Living people
Chilean journalists
University of Chile alumni
Radio Agricultura color commentators
Canal del Fútbol color commentators
Chilean association football commentators